Oxalis pulchella is a species from the genus Oxalis. The species was first described by Richard Anthony Salisbury.

References

pulchella